The Chaná language (autoglossonym: Lanték, that means "speak" or "language"; and this, from lan, "tongue" and tek, a communicative suffix) is one of the Charruan languages spoken by the Chaná people in what is now Argentina and Uruguay along the Uruguay and Paraná Rivers on the margins of the Río de la Plata. It was spoken by the Chaná from pre-Columbian times in the vast region that today is between Entre Ríos Province, Argentina and Uruguay, and the Uruguay and Paraná Guazú Rivers. According to recent oral memory narratives, in ancient times, they inhabited territories around the current Brazilian margin of the Uruguay River. They later migrated from this location along the Uruguay and Paraná Rivers from the outfall of the Iguazú River and from the Paraguay River  to the current location of Asunción.

UNESCO recognizes it as a living language but also as "extremely endangered" because it has only one native speaker. The Chamber of Deputies of the Entre Ríos Province recently recognized the necessity for the government to recognize and protect the language.

Blas Wilfredo Omar Jaime

Blas Wilfredo Omar Jaime (Agó Acoé Inó, "dog without owner-" in the Chaná language, Nogoyá, Entre Rios), an Argentine, is the only native speaker of Chaná. He is now referred to as Tató Oyendén, or custodian of the ancestral memory. 

The language, which Blas learned from his ancestors, was considered extinct before he was interviewed by the linguist José Pedro Viegas Barros. The two men together authored the book "La Lengua Chaná. Patrimonio Cultural de Entre Ríos" published by the official press organ of the provincial government of Entre Ríos. The organ published the book in recognition of "Lanték" (the Chaná language) to support the cultural patrimony of the province.

Dictionary by Viegas-Jaime 
"Lanték" has been recognized as a part of the "Cultural Heritage of the Entre Ríos Province." The first dictionary of the language was published by the Provincial Publishing House of Entre Ríos. The publication contained a dictionary compiled via Don Blas Wilfredo Omar Jaime and an encyclopedic study of Chaná culture. There were also several chapters on the linguistics of Chaná by Viegas Barros. 

The Chaná cultural study encompassed the fourth and last section of the book. A great deal of Chaná ethnoliterature was obtained during elicitation sessions with Viegas Barros during the seven years prior to the publication of the volume. It also has an audio CD which includes recordings that of Don Blas speaking his Lanték.

Phonology 
The following are the phonemes of the Chaná language:

References

Bibliography

External links 

 La guarda memoria (in Spanish), The Memory Keeper (English translation of audio transcript): an episode on the Chaná language featured on the podcast Radio Ambulante.

Charruan languages
Languages of Uruguay
Indigenous languages of the South American Cone
Chaco linguistic area